Edgar Ruben Taylor (March 23, 1877 - January 31, 1912), nicknamed "Rube", was a Major League Baseball pitcher. In his lone major league game, he pitched three innings without giving up a hit or a run, walking nobody and striking out one batter.

External links

Major League Baseball pitchers
St. Louis Cardinals players
Paris Parasites players
Waco Steers players
San Antonio Bronchos players
Austin Senators players
Dallas Giants players
Baseball players from Texas
1877 births
1912 deaths
People from Palestine, Texas